The North Essex League was a football league that was held in Essex, founded in 1895.

History
On 20 March 1895, following a meeting at the George Hotel, Colchester, the North Essex League was voted into existence in order to improve the standard of football in north Essex. On 8 May 1895, following a meeting at the Angel Hotel, Witham, the first constitution for the league was decided, with Braintree Gordon, Chelmsford, Colchester, Colchester Excelsior, Colchester St. Peter's, Harwich & Parkeston, Heybridge and Witham making up the first division. Braintree Gordon II, Bocking, Chelmsford II, Clacton Town, Halstead, Maldon and Manningtree United were announced as founder members of the second division at the same meeting. Alongside the league, a cup competition for North Essex League clubs ran, with Harwich & Parkeston winning the first edition of the cup, beating Braintree 5–2.

The league disbanded at the end of the 1955–56 season.

Champions

North Essex League First Division
1898–99 – Harwich & Parkeston
1899–1900 – Colchester Town
1900–01 – Colchester Town
1902–03 – Heybridge Swifts
1905–06 – Manor Works
1910–11 – Manor Works
1911–12 – Manor Works
1924–25 – Heybridge Swifts

North Essex League Second Division
1898–99 – Clacton Town
1899–1900 – Clacton Town
1946–47 – Tiptree United

Member clubs

Arc Works
Bocking
Braintree
Braintree Gordon
Brightlingsea Town
Burnham Ramblers
Clacton Town
Chelmsford
Chelmsford Swifts
Colchester Crown
Colchester Excelsior
Colchester St. Peter's
Colchester Town
Coggeshall Town
Earls Colne
Great Leighs
Halstead
Harwich & Parkeston
Heybridge Swifts
Maldon
Maldon Town
Manningtree United
Manor Works
Royal Irish Fusiliers
Royal Warwick Regiment
Saffron Walden
Tiptree United
Witham Town

References

 
Defunct football leagues in England
Football in Essex
Sports leagues established in 1895
1895 establishments in England
Sports leagues disestablished in 1956
1956 disestablishments in England